Jim Pfaendtner is an American chemical engineer. He is the Steve and Connie Rogel Professor and Chair of Chemical Engineering & Professor of Chemistry at the University of Washington. He additionally serves as the Associate Vice Provost for Research Computing. Pfaendtner is a staff scientist at the Pacific Northwest National Laboratory.

Background and education
Pfaendtner grew up in West Michigan and graduated from Forest Hills Central High School. He completed his B.S. in chemical engineering from Georgia Institute of Technology and obtained a Ph.D. in chemical engineering from Northwestern University in 2007 under the direction of Linda Broadbelt. Pfaendtner was awarded an International Research Fellowship from the National Science Foundation in 2007 and completed postdoctoral research with Greg Voth and Michele Parrinello from 2007-2009.

Academic career 
In 2009 Pfaendtner began his faculty career at University of Washington as an Assistant Professor of Chemical Engineering. 

In 2012 he was the recipient of a National Science Foundation CAREER award and in 2013 the University of Washington Distinguished Teaching Award. 

Pfaendtner has been an active member of the AIChE Computational Molecular Science and Engineering Forum CoMSEF for over 10 years. 

In 2018 he was appointed as the University of Washington Associate Vice Provost for Research Computing, and in 2019 Department Chair of Chemical Engineering. 

In 2020, Pfaendtner received a joint appointment as Professor of Chemistry.

Research interests 
Research in the Pfaendtner group focuses on the development and use of tools of computational molecular science to aid in analysis and design of new molecules and materials. Current areas of interest include molecular data science, biomolecular simulations, reaction networks and biomimetic materials. The group is particularly interested in advanced applications of research computing to aid in generating high fidelity data sets for machine learning applications as well as the use of advanced simulation methods to study peptide and protein adsorption to interfaces.

Awards and recognition
2021	Google Cloud Research Innovator
2020	Faculty Appreciation for Career Education & Training Award, University of Washington
2013	NAE Frontiers of Engineering Education Participant
2013	University of Washington Presidential Distinguished Teaching Award
2013	ACS COMP OpenEye Outstanding Junior Faculty Award
2012	National Science Foundation CAREER Award
2012	National Academy of Sciences Kavli Fellow
2011	ACS PRF Doctoral New Investigator Award
2007	NSF International Research Fellowship

References

External links
University of Washington Chemical Engineering Profile
Pfaendtner Research Group

Living people
21st-century American engineers
American chemical engineers
University of Washington faculty
Northwestern University alumni
Georgia Tech alumni
Year of birth missing (living people)